Kumylzhenskaya is a rural locality (a stanitsa) and the administrative center of Kumylzhensky District of Volgograd Oblast, Russia. Population:

Geography 

The village is located on the Kumylga river not far from its confluence with the Khopyor.

References

Notes

Sources

Rural localities in Kumylzhensky District